In the Ottoman period, in the 16th century, there was an influential Sokolović family in the Sanjak of Bosnia that had two branches, one that was Eastern Orthodox Christian and was dominant in the Serbian Orthodox Church, while the other became Islamized, and was influential in the Ottoman government. The Orthodox branch included patriarchs Makarije Sokolović (s. 1557–71), Antonije Sokolović (s. 1571–75), Gerasim Sokolović (s. 1575–86) and Savatije Sokolović (s. 1587). The Muslim branch included Sokollu Mehmed Pasha (Mehmed-paša Sokolović), the Ottoman Grand Vizier (s. 1565–79), Sokolluzade Lala Mehmed Pasha Grand vizier (1602-1604) and Sokollu Ferhad Pasha (Ferhad-paša Sokolović), the Beylerbey of Bosnia.

Coat of arms
 
One of the coat of arms included in the Korenić-Neorić Armorial (1595) and the Fojnica Armorial (1675–88) claimed to be that of the "Sokolovich". The coat of arms most likely was attributed to the Sokolović of Glasinac (Sokolac region).

References

Bosnia and Herzegovina families
Serbs from the Ottoman Empire
Bosnian Muslims from the Ottoman Empire
16th-century people from the Ottoman Empire
Families from the Ottoman Empire